The political club is a feature of American urban politics usually representing a particular party in a neighborhood. They were most prominent in the later 19th and early 20th centuries, most famously in Tammany Hall of New York City, which adopted them during the golden age of fraternalism in reaction to a strong challenge from the United Labor Party in 1886. Political clubs were associated with political machines and bossism, but also often saw a split between "regular" and "reform" factions. They formerly often had a prominent local clubhouse, but have declined since politics became less neighborhood-based.

In the later 20th century political clubs also organized around issues, such as affiliates of the Stonewall Democrats.

References

Urban politics in the United States
Political history of New York City
Political party factions in the United States